Andrea Hlaváčková and Renata Voráčová were the defending champions but decided not to participate.
Petra Cetkovská and Alexandra Panova won the final over Irina-Camelia Begu and Alexandra Cadanțu, 3–6, 7–6(7–5), [11–9].

Seeds

Draw

Draw

External links
 Main draw

Grand Prix SAR La Princesse Lalla Meryem - Doubles
2012 Doubles
2012 in Moroccan tennis